The Kaiser Dragon is a car model based on the second-generation Kaiser that was manufactured by Kaiser Motors Corporation in 1953. The dragon name was first used in 1951 for a special trim option on Kaiser cars featuring vinyl upholstery claimed to resemble dragon skin.

1951 
Kaiser introduced an all-new design by Howard "Dutch" Darrin for the 1951 model year with a longer, lower, and wider body featuring the lowest beltline in U.S. car production at that time. Because Kaiser did not offer a V8 engine it focused marketing against the competition by introducing unique trim package for its Deluxe models in the late fall of 1950. A two-page color advertisement that ran in Life was one of the ways the 1951 Kaisers were announced with their redesigned bodies and a new vinyl upholstery option. The upholstery was named "Dragon skin" instead of alligator so customers would not think that it was real alligator skin. The cars also featured thick carpeting.

There was also the second series of cars named for their color (i.e. Mariner Gray was called "Silver Dragon"). The trim was available with a padded vinyl roof, which had a different texture than the interior, and was called "Dinosaur." The last series came only in Tropical Green and were called "Jade Dragons". This option was an extra . 

The dragon name was not used during the 1952 model year.

1953 

The Kaiser Dragon model was introduced on October 31, 1952, for the 1953 model year. This time, the Dragon was a separate model, not a trim option, positioned above the "Manhattan.". The special upholstery and padded roof now featured a grass-patterned "Bambu" vinyl and heavy-duty Belgian linen "Laguna" cloth with overlapping patterns.

Available only as four-door sedans, these cars were upscale in addition to the special trim. Standard equipment included Hydramatic automatic transmission, power steering, electric clock, radio with rear speaker, front and rear center armrests, numerous courtesy lamps, heater, tinted glass, 14-karat gold plated hood ornament and fender nameplates, interior trim (including a nameplate on the glove box door that was personalized with the owner's name), and padding in the glove box. The Dragon models provided for a luxury feel with "almost  of insulation to quiet the ride and give it a sense of additional heft."

Safety features were built in so Kaiser called it "the world's first safety first car" (even though the Tucker 48, a car known for unique features, including safety items, came out five years earlier). Among the standard features were a full padded dash and recessed instruments, an extra large and pop-out windshield, a low center of gravity, steering designed for better control as well as brakes with “more stopping power” and special lighting for better visibility at night.

These cars were expensive for the time at  A comparable 1953 Buick Roadmaster was priced at $3,358 and came with   V8 compared to the Dragon's   I6 engine. Along with being more expensive, Dragon's 0-60 mph time was 15 seconds. 

A total of 1,277 were sold.

References

Cars of the United States
Cars introduced in 1953
Kaiser Motors